The Ministry of Communication is a ministry of the Government of Haiti. This ministry is responsible for communications and is part of the Prime Minister's Cabinet.

Government ministries of Haiti